Bachler may refer to:

Benjamin Bachler (born 1994), Austrian footballer
Klaus Bachler (born 1991), Austrian race driver
Lee Aaron Bachler (1925–1979), American politician, Missouri senator 
Reinhold Bachler (born 1944), Austrian ski-jumper
Thomas Bachler (born 1965), Austrian bobsledder